Ofelia Gelvezon-Tequi (born June 4, 1942) is a Filipina visual artist based in France. She works primarily in the media of painting and printmaking and is considered a pioneer in Philippine printmaking. Her prints are created using copper-plate etching and viscosity color printing techniques.

Early life and education 

Gelvezon-Tequi was born June 4, 1942, in Guimbal, Iloilo, Philippines. Her family moved around during her childhood due to her father's employment in the Philippine Army. During her childhood she lived in Paco, Iloilo, and Lucena.

Gelvezon-Tequi graduated from the University of Philippines-Diliman with degrees in English (1966) and Fine Arts (1964). She continued her education at the Accademia di Belle Arti di Roma, earning a diploma in painting in 1967. A scholarship from the Rockefeller Foundation enabled her to study graphic arts at the Pratt Institute.

Artistic style and works 
Many of Gelvezon-Tequi's works explore women's central and varied roles in society Other themes include the intertwined existence of the sacred with everyday objects, emotions, aspects of family life and work, and political realities. Many of her works incorporate allegorical symbolism and draw inspiration from literature, philosophy, and art history, including Catholic iconography inherited via Spanish colonialism and Malay spiritual beliefs, such as the use of amulets in anting-anting.

Gelvezon-Tequi has also spoken about the importance the concept of justice and giving voice to the voiceless plays in her art. Some of her pieces are blatantly political, including one depicting a former Philippine president wearing a virtual reality headset, oblivious to the impoverished material reality faced by the woman and children who stand nearby, in the background. A set of 1987 highly-political triptychs entitled Homage to Ambrogio Lorenzetti, Homage II to Ambrogio Lorenzetti, and Homage III to Ambrogio Lorenzetti contrasts the virtues of benevolent rulers, good governments, and the social prosperity these create with the vices of tyrannical leaders, their dysfunctional governments, and the dystopian social situations created as a result.

Gelvezon-Tequi described her printmaking as an improvisatory process in which the artist encountered visual surprises which, then, guide them in certain directions. Of this process she explained: "You have to be humble and accept that you cannot control everything. Sometimes, it turns out better than what you have planned before."

Her 2020 exhibition, Allegories and Realities, a retrospective of Gelvezon-Tequi's half a century-long career featured 219 of her works, including a series of lesser known silk paintings.

Her work has been grouped with other Filipino artists, like Imelda Cajipe-Endaya, Ben Cabrera, and Brenda Fajardo, for creating new ways for Filipinos to understand their history within the context of colonialism as well as imagine new narratives outside this context.

She has taught art history, printmaking, and book design at the University of the Philippines as well as served as Director for the Art Association of the Philippines.

Personal life 
Gelvezon-Tequi has lived in many places, including Hanoi and Boracay. Since 2005, Gelvezon-Tequi has lived with her husband, Marc Téqui, in the rural village of Limeuil, France where, in the 1990s, they bought a 17th-century house built on top of a 13th-century cellar. In France, she enjoys gardening vegetables, including a native Filipino mountain variety of kangkong, for her grandchildren to eat as well as growing flowers.

Gelvezon-Tequi and husband Marc, a former French instructor, met at the University of Philippines-Diliman Faculty Center. The couple raised three children: a daughter and two sons. She makes frequent return visits to her native Philippines and chooses to create art primarily for Filipino audiences. Her close family and friends call her "Ofie."

Selected exhibitions 
2020 Allegories and Realities, Ofelia Gelvezon-Tequi: In Retrospect, Cultural Center of the Philippines, Pasay, Philippines
2018 Shifts in Context, National Museum of Fine Arts, Manila, Philippines
2015 Philippine Madonna, The Crucible Art Gallery, 4/L, The Artwalk, SM Megamall, Mandaluyong
2002 Contemporary Filipino Artists, The Foreign Correspondents' Club, Hong Kong
2000-2002 Faith and the City: A Survey of Contemporary Filipino Art, Earl Lu Gallery Lasalle-SIA College of the Arts, Singapore; National Art Gallery of Malaysia, Kuala Lumpur, Malaysia; ABN AMRO House, Georgetown, Malaysia; The Art Center, Chulalongkorn University, Bangkok, Thailand; Metropolitan Museum of Manila, Manila, Philippines
1996 The CCP at the MET, Metropolitan Museum of Manila
1972 Thirteen Artists, Cultural Center of the Philippines

Awards 
2002 Michiko Takamatsu Prize, Salon des Artistes Français
2014 Pamana ng Pilipino Award
2002 Lucien and Suzanne Jonas Prize, Salon des Artistes Français, Paris 
1982 Art Association of the Philippines, gold medal for printmaking
1972 Thirteen Artists Award, Cultural Center of the Philippines

See also 

 List of Filipino women artists

References

External links 
Ateneo Art Gallery
Ofelia Gelvezon-Tequi: Shifts in Context, March 8-June 3, 2018, Gallery XVII, National Museum of Fine Arts Catalog

Filipino artists
Filipino women artists
Filipino printmakers
Women printmakers
1944 births
Living people